Pachyballus ornatus is a species of jumping spider in the genus Pachyballus that lives in the Democratic Republic of the Congo and Tanzania. The species was first described in 2020 based on a holotype in the California Academy of Sciences.

References

Salticidae
Spiders described in 2020
Spiders of Africa
Taxa named by Wanda Wesołowska